Agapka may refer to:
Agapka, a diminutive of the Russian male first name Agap
Agapka, a diminutive of the Russian male first name Agapit